Muenster may refer to:

 Münster, Germany
 Muenster, Saskatchewan
 Muenster, Texas
 Muenster cheese

See also 
 Munster (disambiguation)